The Democratic Solidarity Party (Partido Solidaridad Democrática) was a political liberal party in Cuba. Although changes to the Cuban constitution in 1992 decriminalized the right to form political parties other than the Communist Party of Cuba, these parties are not permitted to campaign or engage in any public political activities on the island. The Democratic Solidarity party described itself as "an organization from within Cuba promoting democracy and the respect for human rights by the peaceful route." The last President of the party was Fernando Sánchez López. The party was a full member of Liberal International.

It merged with the National Liberal Party of Cuba in February 2014 to form the Cuban Liberal Solidarity Party (PSLC).

Membership 

In February 2007 the following persons were elected to the national executive committee of PSD:
 Fernando Sánchez López, President.
 Antonio Torres Justo, Vice president pro tempore and executive secretary
 Carlos Aitcheson Guzmán, international relations pro tempore
 Marcos Fiallo Samper, Finances
 Ignacio Padrón Navarro, Organizer
 Osmar Laffita, public relacions and spokesperson
 Orestes Cartaya Lirio, youth issues
 Juan de Dios Duke, human rights and attention to political prisoners
 Raúl Chávez Valdivia, Representative of the oriental provinces Granma, Santiago de Cuba, Guantánamo.
 Wilber Hernández Acosta, epresentantive of the oriental provinces Ciego de Avila, Camagüey, Las Tunas, Holguín
 Rolando Delgado, epresentantive of the occidental provinces
 Jorge Verrier Rodríguez, epresentantive of the central provinces
 Rafael Arias Carmona, workers and farmers issues
 Adolfo Fernández Sainz, international relations, imprisoned in the Black Spring of 2003
 Margarita Cienfuegos, women's secretary

Provincial delegates

 Rolando Delgado Ramos, Pinar del Río
 Ignacio Padrón Navarro, Havana province
 Hermes Diago Gómez, Matanzas
 Ricardo Filgueira Fajardo, Cienfuegos
 Juan de Dios Ortueta, Villa Clara
 Rubén Mulén Torno, S.Spíritus
 Israel Savigñon Revé, Camagüey
 Amauri Peña Rodríguez, Las Tunas
 Raúl Chávez Valdivia. Granma
 Eidy Graña Toledo, Holguín
 Dr. Arnoldo de la Cruz Bañobre, Santiago de Cuba.
 Argos Alejandro Matos Ricardo, Havana city

See also 

List of political parties in Cuba
Contributions to liberal theory
Liberalism worldwide
List of liberal parties
Liberal democracy
Liberalism in Cuba

References

External links

1992 establishments in Cuba
2014 disestablishments in Cuba
Defunct political parties in Cuba
Liberal parties in Cuba
Opposition to Fidel Castro
Political parties disestablished in 2014
Political parties established in 1992